Swedish Golfer of the Year is awarded annually by the Swedish Golf Federation.

The award is individual and awarded since 1966 to the Swedish golfer with the best overall golf performance each year, either in a series of achievements or a single big success. In the assessment the event difficulty, the competition, any surprises and pressing conditions are considered. The jury is made up of player representatives from PGA Sweden, golf journalists, and officials from the Swedish Golf Federation.

Winners

1966–1975	
1966 – Liv Wollin (a)
1967 – Claes Jöhncke (a)
1968 – Liv Wollin (a)
1969 – Claes Jöhncke (a)
1970 – Hans Hedjerson (a)
1971 – Gunnar Mueller (a)
1972 – Christina Westerberg (a)
1973 – Hans Hedjerson (a)
1974 – Jan Rube (a)
1975 – Göran Lundqvist (a)

1976–1985	
1976 – Hans Hedjerson (a)
1977 – Mikael Sorling (a)
1978 – Mikael Sorling (a)
1979 – Björn Svedin (a)
1980 – Anders Johnsson (a)
1981 – Krister Kinell (a)
1982 – Magnus Persson Atlevi (a)
1983 – Charlotte Montgomery
1984 – Anders Forsbrand
1985 – Liselotte Neumann

1986–1995	
1986 – Ove Sellberg
1987 – Anders Forsbrand
1988 – Liselotte Neumann
1989 – Sofia Grönberg-Whitmore
1990 – Helen Alfredsson
1991 – Per-Ulrik Johansson
1992 – Anders Forsbrand
1993 – Joakim Haeggman
1994 – Liselotte Neumann
1995 – Annika Sörenstam

1996–2005	
1996 – Annika Sörenstam
1997 – Annika Sörenstam
1998 – Annika Sörenstam
1999 – Jesper Parnevik
2000 – Sophie Gustafson
2001 – Annika Sörenstam
2002 – Annika Sörenstam
2003 – Annika Sörenstam
2004 – Annika Sörenstam
2005 – Annika Sörenstam

2006–2014	
2006 – Henrik Stenson
2007 – Henrik Stenson
2008 – Robert Karlsson
2009 – Anna Nordqvist
2010 – Robert Karlsson
2011 – Caroline Hedwall
2012 – Peter Hanson
2013 – Henrik Stenson
2014 – Henrik Stenson

2015– 	

(a) indicates amateur status during main part of season in question.

Multiple winners

See also
European Tour Golfer of the Year
Ladies European Tour Golfer of the Year
Guldbollen

References 

Sport in Sweden
Awards established in 1966
1966 establishments in Sweden
Swedish sports trophies and awards